Alcester, a village in Dorset, England, is a liberty in the parish of St. James Shaftesbury, within the parliamentary borough of Shaftesbury, but without the municipal borough, Dorset. Pop., 342. Houses, 76

References

Villages in Dorset